Mount Erongo (21º37'S 15º40'E) is a mountain of 2,350 metres northeast of Swakopmund in Erongo Region, Namibia. Like the Brandberg Mountain it is a granitic intrusion. It is the only place on Earth that Versicorpus erongoensis, a dung beetle species, occurs.

Geography of Erongo Region
Erongo
Namibian savanna woodlands